Kjell Svindland (born 15 April 1933) is a Norwegian politician for the Christian Democratic Party.

He served as a deputy representative to the Norwegian Parliament from Vest-Agder during the terms 1973–1977, 1977–1981, 1981–1985, 1985–1989 and 1989–1993.

Following the 1995 elections, Svindland became the new county mayor (fylkesordfører) of Vest-Agder. In 1999 he was succeeded by Thore Westermoen from the same party.

References

1933 births
Living people
Deputy members of the Storting
Christian Democratic Party (Norway) politicians
Vest-Agder politicians
Chairmen of County Councils of Norway